Buckingham Township is a township in Bucks County, Pennsylvania. The population was 20,075 at the 2010 census. Buckingham takes its name from Buckingham in Buckinghamshire, England.

History
In Buckingham and the Buckingham area, there are many important yet little known historical landmarks. One is Bogarts Tavern (now the General Greene Inn), on the corner of Route 413 (Durham Road) and Route 263 (Old York Road). It was from this building that General Nathanael Greene, commander of George Washington's left wing during the Battle of Trenton, made his headquarters during the winter of 1776.

The Buckingham Friends Meeting House, Byecroft Farm Complex, Forest Grove Historic District, Thomas and Lydia Gilbert Farm, Holicong Village Historic District, Longland, Mechanicsville Village Historic District, Spring Valley Historic District, and Wycombe Village Historic District are listed on the National Register of Historic Places.  The Buckingham Friends Meeting House is also designated a National Historic Landmark District.

Mount Gilead A.M.E. Church was a station on the Underground Railroad.

Geography
It is drained by the Delaware River and its villages include Bridge Valley, Buckingham, Buckingham Valley, Forest Grove, Furlong (also in Doylestown Township,) Highton (also in Solebury Township,) Holicong, Lahaska (also in Solebury Township,) Mechanicsville, Mozart, Pineville (also in Wrightstown Township,) and Wycombe (also in Wrightstown Township.)

Buckingham Township is home to a gravity hill, on Buckingham Mountain near Mount Gilead African Methodist Episcopal Church.

Past and present place names in Buckingham Township have included Beckytown, Broad Axe, Buckingham, Clayton, Cross Keys, Forest Grove, Furlong, Glendale, Highlon, Holicong, Hollekonk, Lahaska, Landisville, Mechanicsville, Mozart, Pineville, Pools Corner, Spring Valley, and Wycombe.

Natural features include Robin Run, Buckingham Cave, Buckingham Mountain, Curls Run, Dark Hollow, Flatiron Hill, Lahaska Creek, Lahaska Hill, Mill Creek, Neshaminy Creek, Paunacussing Creek, Pidcock Creek, Pine Run, and Watson Creek.

Neighboring municipalities
Solebury Township (northeast)
Upper Makefield Township (east)
Wrightstown Township (southeast)
Warwick Township (south)
Doylestown Township (southwest and west)
Doylestown (west)
Plumstead Township (northwest)

Demographics

As of the 2010 census, the township was 93.8% White, 1.1% Black or African American, 0.1% Native American, 3.4% Asian, and 1.2% were two or more races. People of Hispanic or Latino ancestry accounted for 2.4% of the population.

As of the census of 2000, there were 16,442 people, 5,711 households, and 4,694 families residing in the township.  The population density was 497.0 people per square mile (191.9/km2).  There were 5,861 housing units at an average density of 177.2/sq mi (68.4/km2).  The racial makeup of the township was 96.75% White, 1.04% African American, 0.12% Native American, 1.19% Asian, 0.01% Pacific Islander, 0.26% from other races, and 0.64% from two or more races. Hispanic or Latino of any race were 1.34% of the population.

There were 5,711 households, out of which 40.2% had children under the age of 18 living with them, 75.8% were married couples living together, 4.5% had a female householder with no husband present, and 17.8% were non-families. 14.3% of all households were made up of individuals, and 6.2% had someone living alone who was 65 years of age or older.  The average household size was 2.85 and the average family size was 3.18.

In the township, the population was spread out, with 28.3% under the age of 18, 4.1% from 18 to 24, 28.4% from 25 to 44, 25.9% from 45 to 64, and 13.3% who were 65 years of age or older.  The median age was 40 years. For every 100 females there were 94.9 males.  For every 100 females age 18 and over, there were 93.3 males.

The median income for a household in the township was $82,376, and the median income for a family was $90,968. Males had a median income of $71,649 versus $42,973 for females. The per capita income for the township was $35,735.  About 2.4% of families and 4.1% of the population were below the poverty line, including 5.4% of those under age 18 and 2.3% of those age 65 or over.

Climate
According to the Köppen climate classification system, Buckingham Twp has a Hot-summer, Humid continental climate (Dfa). Dfa climates are characterized by at least one month having an average mean temperature ≤ , at least four months with an average mean temperature ≥ , at least one month with an average mean temperature ≥  and no significant precipitation difference between seasons. Although most summer days are slightly humid in Buckingham Twp, episodes of heat and high humidity can occur with heat index values > . The average wettest month is July which corresponds with the annual peak in thunderstorm activity. Episodes of extreme cold and wind can occur with wind chill values < . Ice storms and large snowstorms depositing ≥  of snow occur once every few years, particularly during nor’easters from December through February.

Ecology

According to the A. W. Kuchler U.S. potential natural vegetation types, Buckingham Twp would have a dominant vegetation type of Appalachian Oak (104) with a dominant vegetation form of Eastern Hardwood Forest (25). The spring bloom typically begins by April 11 and fall color usually peaks by October 31.

Transportation

Major roads in Buckingham Township include U.S. Route 202, which runs southwest–northeast through the township between Doylestown and Lahaska along Doylestown Buckingham Pike, York Road, and Lower York Road; Pennsylvania Route 263, which runs north–south through the township along York Road (running concurrent with US 202 between Buckingham and Lahaska) and Upper York Road; Pennsylvania Route 313, which runs northwest–southeast along the southwestern border of the township  between Doylestown and its eastern terminus at PA 263; and Pennsylvania Route 413, which runs northwest–southeast through the township along Durham Road. The New Hope Railroad passes through the eastern portion of the township. 

Public transportation in Buckingham Township is limited to a small section of the SEPTA City Bus Route 55 line that passes through the western corner of the township along Easton Road on its route between Doylestown and Olney Transportation Center in North Philadelphia. Trans-Bridge Lines provides intercity bus service to Port Authority Bus Terminal in New York City from a stop at Peddler's Village in Lahaska along a route that originates in Quakertown.

Notable people
 , represented New Jersey's 2nd congressional district in the United States House of Representatives from 1851 to 1855.

References

External links

Buckingham Township

Townships in Bucks County, Pennsylvania